The 2017–18 Biathlon World Cup – Sprint Men started on Saturday 2 December 2017 in Östersund and will finish on Thursday 22 March 2018 in Tyumen. The defending titlist is Martin Fourcade of France.

Competition format
The  sprint race is the third oldest biathlon event; the distance is skied over three laps. The biathlete shoots two times at any shooting lane, first prone, then standing, totalling 10 targets. Competitors' starts are staggered, normally by 30 seconds.

2016–17 Top 3 standings

Medal winners

Standings

References

Sprint Men